In graph theory, a bound graph expresses which pairs of elements of some partially ordered set have an upper bound.  Rigorously, any graph G is a bound graph if there exists a partial order ≤ on the vertices of G with the property that for any vertices u and v of G, uv is an edge of G if and only if u ≠ v and there is a vertex w such that u ≤ w and v ≤ w.

Bound graphs are sometimes referred to as upper bound graphs, but the analogously defined lower bound graphs comprise exactly the same class—any lower bound for ≤ is easily seen to be an upper bound for the dual partial order ≥.

References 

Graph families
Order theory